Ravno Bučje is a village in the municipality of Bujanovac, Serbia. According to the 2002 census, the settlement has a population of 393 people. Of these, 391 (99,49 %) were ethnic Albanians, and 2 	(0,50 %) others.

References

Populated places in Pčinja District
Albanian communities in Serbia